UPK may refer to:
 University Press of Kansas, an academic publisher
 University Press of Kentucky, an academic publisher
 UPK, LID code for Upernavik Kujalleq Heliport, Avannaata municipality, Greenland
 User Productivity Kit, part of the Oracle Applications software
 Universal Pre-Kindergarten, alternate term for Universal preschool